Ali Rais (also Romanized as ‘Alī Ra’īs) is a village in Neh Rural District, in the Central District of Nehbandan County, South Khorasan Province, Iran. At the 2006 census, its population was 431, in 110 families.

References 

Populated places in Nehbandan County